Ograzhden Cove is the 680 m wide cove indenting for 550 m the northwest coast of Ray Promontory, part of Svishtov Cove in Byers Peninsula, Livingston Island in the South Shetland Islands, Antarctica.  The cove is entered south of Essex Point and north of Kardzhali Point.

The feature is "named after Ograzhden Mountain in southwestern Bulgaria."

Location
British mapping in 1968, Spanish in 1993 and Bulgarian in 2009.

Maps
 Península Byers, Isla Livingston. Mapa topográfico a escala 1:25000. Madrid: Servicio Geográfico del Ejército, 1992.
 L.L. Ivanov. Antarctica: Livingston Island and Greenwich, Robert, Snow and Smith Islands. Scale 1:120000 topographic map.  Troyan: Manfred Wörner Foundation, 2009.  
 Antarctic Digital Database (ADD). Scale 1:250000 topographic map of Antarctica. Scientific Committee on Antarctic Research (SCAR). Since 1993, regularly upgraded and updated.
 L.L. Ivanov. Antarctica: Livingston Island and Smith Island. Scale 1:100000 topographic map. Manfred Wörner Foundation, 2017.

References

External links
 Ograzhden Cove. Copernix satellite image

Coves of Livingston Island
Bulgaria and the Antarctic